TVCC may refer to:

 Beijing Television Cultural Center
 Treasure Valley Community College
 Trinity Valley Community College
 Tanana Valley Community College, former name of UAF Community and Technical College